Northern Tigers FC is a semi-professional Association football club based in the northern suburbs area of Sydney, spanning the Lower North Shore, Upper North Shore and reaching up to Brooklyn on the banks of the Hawkesbury River. The Northern Tigers enter teams in the Football NSW League One (formerly National Premier Leagues NSW Men's 2) (Men and Boys), National Premier Leagues NSW Women's (Women and Girls), FNSW Skills Acquisition Program (Mixed Under 9 - Under 12 and Girls Under 10 - Under 13).

Home games are played at North Turramurra Recreation Area (NTRA), with Charles Bean Sports Field, at the former Ku-ring-gai Campus of the University of Technology, Sydney acting as an additional facility.

History 
Ku-ring-gai & District Soccer Association purchased a NSW Soccer Federation Division 1 license from the Balmain Tigers in 2002. The name was then changed to Northern Tigers and Northern Tigers FC was established.

In 2003 they were premiers of FNSW Men's Division 1 and were promoted to the FNSW Super League (now National Premier Leagues NSW Men's 2). In 2007 they were Premiers of Super League but declined promotion to FNSW Premier League (now National Premier Leagues NSW Men's 1). In 2010 they were Champions of FNSW Super League after defeating St. George FC 4–0 in the Grand Final.

The 2015 NPL NSW2 season, saw their senior side crowned champions however due to the club championship promotion criteria by Football NSW (which are points accumulated across the U20' and U18's as well), they were not promoted.

Club colours 
Northern Tigers FC players wear white with bottle green when playing at home and purple with white when playing away.

Location 
The Northern Tigers have an intake area for players that includes most of the northern corridor of Sydney that stretches from the Sydney Harbour Bridge to the Hawkesbury River.

Players come from suburbs including Berowra, Gordon, Pymble, Lindfield, Killara, Lane Cove, Chatswood, Wahroonga, Artamon, Hornsby, Willoughby, and Turramurra.

Notable former players

Socceroos 
Murray Barnes
Robert Hooker
Bruce Djite
Grant Lee
Robert Wheatley

Matildas 

 Rachel Lowe
 Thea Slatyer
 Servet Uzunlar
 Leigh Wardell
 Eliza Campbell

International 
Adam Foti

U20 Youth International 
Brett Hughes

AFC U19 Young Socceroos 
 Travis Cooper

National League or A-League 
Andy Harper
Brett Hughes
Brian Ellem
Duncan Worthington
Stuart Robertson
Adam Snyder
James Stubbs-Mills
Grant Last
Derek Poimer

Season by season record

 * Current Season in Play, Last round to be played on 1st August 2021

Source: ozfootball.net

Notes

Northern Suburbs Football Association 
The Northern Suburbs Football Association was formed in April 1957 as Ku-Ring-Gai & District Soccer Association (KDSA). There were five foundation clubs – Kissing Point, Wahroonga, West Pymble, North Turramurra and Lindfield. The first representative teams entered in NSW Federation competitions in 1959 or 1960, with the first senior representative side competing in 1963 as Ku-Ring-Gai United. In 1970 Ku-ring-gai merged with Artarmon to enter the NSW Federation competition and changed its name in 1972 to Ku-ring-gai Soccer Club. NSW Soccer Federation also approved the merger of the KDSA with the Northern Suburbs Soccer Association for the 1973 season. The district would continue to operate as KDSA. In 2012, the association changed its name to Northern Suburbs Football Association to more accurately reflect district boundaries and remain in line of the national use of "football" within federations.

References

External links 
NSW Super League
Northern Tigers FC
Northern Suburbs Football Association

Soccer clubs in New South Wales
Association football clubs established in 2002
2002 establishments in Australia